Pogoro (Pogoro Mossi) is a village in the Koumbri Department of Yatenga Province in northern Burkina Faso. It has a population of 925.

Notes

External links
 

Populated places in the Nord Region (Burkina Faso)
Yatenga Province